Dorothy Marie Sorteberg Kellogg (July 26, 1920 – September 15, 2018) was an American politician in the state of South Dakota. She was a member of the South Dakota House of Representatives and South Dakota State Senate. She attended Watertown High School and  graduated in 1938. Kellogg was also a secretary at the South Dakota State Highway Department, accountant, Chairwoman of the Codington County Democratic Party, and a member of the South Dakota State Democratic Party Executive Board. She was a United Methodist. Kellogg died in September 2018 at the age of 98.

References

1920 births
2018 deaths
South Dakota Democrats
People from Minneapolis